Mountmellick GAA  (Irish: Cumann Luthchleas Gael Móinteach Milic)  is a Gaelic Athletic Association Gaelic Football and Hurling club in the town of Mountmellick in County Laois, Ireland.

Mountmellick GAA is bordered by neighbouring clubs, The Rock, Kilcavan, Ballyfin and Rosenallis.

At adult level, the club is a dual football and hurling club. Mountmellick field football teams at Intermediate and junior B. They field hurling teams at Intermediate and Junior B.

In recent years juvenile football and hurling affairs have been catered for by the Sarsfields(Football) and Na Fianna(Hurling) amalgamations, an amalgamation with neighbouring club, Ballyfin

History 
In 2006, Mountmellick bridged a 38-year gap to win the Laois Intermediate Football Championship for just the second time ever, beating Annanough in the final. The first IFC title was won in 1968.

Mountmellick has won the Laois Junior Football Championship five times and the Laois Minor Football Championship twice, in 1975 and 1977.

Mountmellick has also won the Laois Intermediate Hurling Championship on one occasion in 1967 with five wins in the Laois Junior Hurling Championship also to their credit. Mountmellick are the only Laois club to have won both Junior titles in the one year (1941). They also came very close to winning both intermediate titles in one year (1967), winning the hurling and losing the football to Arles in a replay.

County players 
Numerous Mountmellick footballers and hurlers have represented Laois senior and underage county teams over the years.
Listed below are just some of the well known ones.

 Shane Conlon
 Gearoid Hanrahan
 Des Houlihan
 Ivor Houlihan
 Declan O'Loughlin, #15 in Laois's first Leinster final appearance for 13 years in 1981, aged 22
 John O'Loughlin
 PJ Payne
 Danny Reddin, #7 in Laois's first Leinster final appearance for 13 years in 1981, aged 26
 Ger Reddin
 Donie O'Mahoney
Donnacha Hartnett

Championship honours

Football 

* Denotes as part of Sarsfields or Sarsfields Gaels (Mountmellick, Ballyfin, Kilcavan)

Hurling

Managers

Football

Hurling

References

External links
 Mountmelick GAA Official Website
 Laoistalk - Laois GAA News Website

 
Gaelic games clubs in County Laois
Gaelic football clubs in County Laois